Holliday is both a surname and a given name. Notable people with the name Holliday or Hollyday include:

Surname
 Charles O. Holliday (born 1948), American businessman
 Christopher Hollyday, jazz alto saxophonist
 Cyrus K. Holliday (1826–1900), co-founder of Topeka, Kansas
 D. Van Holliday (1940–2010), American physicist
 David Holliday (1937–1999), American singer/actor & voice actor
 Doc Holliday (announcer), American radio personality
 Doc Holliday (1851–1887), American gambler, gunfighter, and dentist
 Frank Holliday (born 1957), American painter
 Fred Holliday (disambiguation)
 Frederick W. M. Holliday (1828–1899), Governor of Virginia from 1878 to 1882
 George Holliday (disambiguation)
 Guy T. O. Hollyday (1893–1991), American businessman, head of the Federal Housing Administration from 1953 to 1954
 J. S. Holliday (1924–2006), American historian and author of major book on the California Gold Rush
 James Holliday (politician) (1818–1851), American lawyer
 Jennifer Holliday (born 1960), American singer
 Jessie Holliday (1884–1915), English artist
 John Holliday (pioneer), early American pioneer of Western Virginia (modern West Virginia)
 Johnny Holliday (born 1937), American radio and TV sportscaster
 Josh Holliday, American college baseball coach
 Judy Holliday (1921–1965), American actress
 Leonard Holliday (c. 1550 – 1612), Lord Mayor of London
 Sister Mary Melanie Holliday (1850-1939), American Catholic nun
 Matt Holliday (born 1980), American baseball player
 Michael Holliday (1924–1963), British singer
 Polly Holliday (born 1937), American actress
 Robert Holliday, American politician
 Robert Cortes Holliday, American writer and book editor
 Robin Holliday (born 1932), English geneticist
 Sie Holliday (died 2006), American radio broadcaster
 Tess Holliday (born 1985), American plus-size model (professional name)
 Trindon Holliday (born 1986), American football player
 Vonnie Holliday (born 1975), American football player
 Captain Will Hollyday (died 1697), English military captain and highwayman

Given name
 Holliday Grainger (born 1988), British actress
 Holliday Bickerstaffe Kendall (1844–1919), Primitive Methodist minister

Fictional characters
 Luke Holliday, a character in the Netflix series 13 Reasons Why

See also
Holiday (surname)

English-language surnames